Golan Haberfield Maaka (4 April 1904 – 17 May 1978) was a New Zealand medical doctor. Of Māori descent, he identified with the Ngāti Kahungunu and Ngāi Tahu iwi. He was born in Takapau, Hawke's Bay Region, New Zealand on 4 April 1904. He was educated at Te Aute College, Dannevirke High School, and the University of Otago. He was one of New Zealand's first full-time Māori general practitioners (GP).

References

1904 births
1978 deaths
New Zealand general practitioners
Ngāi Tahu people
Ngāti Kahungunu people
New Zealand Māori medical doctors
People from Takapau
20th-century New Zealand medical doctors
People educated at Te Aute College
People educated at Dannevirke High School
University of Otago alumni